Rehder is a German surname. Notable people with this surname include the following:

 Alfred Rehder (1863–1949), German-American botanist and Harvard professor
 Elke Rehder (born 1953), German artist
 Harald Alfred Rehder (1907–1996), American malacologist
 Heinrich Rehder (1887–1976), German athlete
 Lois Corea Rehder (1911–1988), from the USA, spouse of Harald Alfred Rehder
 Patrícia Rehder Galvão, known as Pagu (1910–1962), Brazilian poet, journalist and translator. 
 Tom Rehder (born 1965), American football player

See also
 Reder
 Reeder

German-language surnames